Alan Mitchell may refer to:
 Alan Mitchell (botanist)
 Alan Mitchell (comics)
 Alan Mitchell (politician)

See also
 Allan C. G. Mitchell, American physicist